David Attenborough's Natural History Museum Alive is a 2014 British documentary film. Written and presented by David Attenborough, it aired on Sky One on New Year's Day 2014.

The documentary was filmed at the Natural History Museum, London, and uses CGI imagery to bring to life several of the extinct animal skeletons in the museum, including Archaeopteryx, the giant moa and Haast's eagle, Gigantopithecus (contrasting prevailing expert opinion; presented as bipedal and more hominin than pongine), Glossotherium, Smilodon, Ichthyosaurus and the London-based replica of the famous Diplodocus skeleton Dippy.

The documentary was well-received, and won a TV BAFTA in the specialist factual category. A 3D companion book for the documentary was released under the same name.

References

External links 
  at Sky.com

2014 documentary films
BAFTA winners (television series)
British television documentaries
Documentary films about prehistoric life
David Attenborough
Films scored by Ilan Eshkeri
Films shot in London
Sky UK original programming
Natural History Museum, London